Gray is a surname that can come from a variety of origins but is typically found in Scotland, Ireland and England.

In Ireland, the surname may have a Gaelic source from a phonetic transcription, or Anglicization of McGrath or McGraw. "Mac Giolla Riabhaigh" is sometimes Gray, but is also Anglicized to "McGreevy," "Gallery" and others.

In most Scottish instances, the name "Gray" is from the Germanic Scots language, and is cognate with Old English, "græg", meaning "grey", probably as a hair colour.

Also among Irish and Scottish Grays is the English name of Anglo-Norman origin. A knight of Viking origin, Anchetil de Greye, accompanied William the Conqueror in his 1066 invasion of England. de Greye's descendants would become bishops John de Gray of Norwich and Walter de Gray of York.

A
Aaron Gray, basketball player for the Detroit Pistons
Adam Gray, American politician
Adeline Gray (parachutist) (1915/16–1975), American parachutist
Adrian Gray, English darts player
Ahuvah Gray
Alan Gray (1855–1935), British organist and composer
Alasdair Gray (1934–2019), Scottish writer and artist
Alexander Gray (disambiguation), multiple people
Alfred Gray (disambiguation), multiple people
Alice Gray, American entomologist
Allan Gray (disambiguation), multiple people
Andre Gray, English professional footballer
Andrew Gray (disambiguation), multiple people
Andy Gray (disambiguation), multiple people
Archibald Montague Henry Gray (1880-1967), British physician
Archie Gray (1878–1943), Scottish footballer
Arthur Wellesley Gray (1876–1944), Canadian politician, creator of Wells Gray Provincial Park
Asa Gray (1810–1888), American botanist
Avis Gray (born 1954), Canadian politician

B
Barry Gray (1908–1984), British musician and composer
Barry Gray (radio) (1916–1996), American radio personality
Benjamin Kirkman Gray (1862–1907), English economist and author

C
Carl Raymond Gray, American railroad president
Carolyn Gray, Canadian playwright
Catriona Gray, Filipino-Australian, model, singer and beauty pageant titleholder who won Miss Universe 2018
Cecil Gray (disambiguation), multiple people
Chad Gray, HELLYEAH and former Mudvayne vocalist
Charles Gray (disambiguation), multiple people
Charles McNeill Gray, American politician
Charlotte Gray (disambiguation), multiple people
Cheryl A. Gray Evans, Louisiana politician
Chris Gray (disambiguation), multiple people
Christopher Gray, American journalist
Christopher Gray, British organist
Clifton Daggett Gray, American Baptist, President of Bates College
Coleen Gray (1922–2015), American actress
Conan Gray (1998), American musician, songwriter and internet personality

D
Dana Sue Gray, American serial killer
Dan Gray (disambiguation), multiple people
Dave Gray, major league pitcher
David Gray (disambiguation), multiple people
Dean Gray, pseudonym
Dennis Gray (born 1935), English mountain climber
Derwin Gray (offensive lineman) (born 1995), American football player
Devin Gray (1972–2013), American basketball player
Dick Gray (1931–2013), Irish-American baseball player
Dobie Gray, American musician
Dolores Gray, American musical theatre actress
Dorian Gray, fictional character in Oscar Wilde's The Picture of Dorian Gray
Dorian Gray (actress) (1928–2011), Italian actress
Dulcie Gray, British actress
Dunc Gray, Australian cyclist

E
Eddie Gray (disambiguation), multiple people
Edmund Gray, American politician
Edmund Dwyer-Gray, Irish-Australian politician
Edward Leslie Gray, Canadian politician and member of the Legislative Assembly of Alberta
Edward Whitaker Gray, English physician & botanist
Effie Gray, wife of John Ruskin and John Everett Millais
Eileen Gray, Irish furniture designer and architect
Elisha Gray, American electrical engineer
Elizabeth Gray (disambiguation), multiple people
Elspet Gray (1929–2013), Scottish actress
Eric Gray (disambiguation), multiple people
Erin Gray, American actress
Eva Gray (actress)
Eva Gray (cricketer)
Evan Gray, New Zealand cricketer

F
Farrah Gray
Frank Gray
Frank Gray (politician)
Frank Gray (researcher)
Fred Gray (disambiguation), multiple people

G
Gabriel "Sylar" Gray, character on the television show Heroes
Gary Gray (disambiguation), multiple people
F. Gary Gray
Gary LeRoi Gray, American actor
 Geoffrey Gray (born 1997), American-Israeli professional basketball player in the Israeli Basketball Premier League
George Gray (disambiguation), multiple people
Gilda Gray
Glen Gray
Gregory Gray
Gustave Le Gray

H
Hamish Gray, Baron Gray of Contin (1927–2006), Scottish politician
Hanna Holborn Gray (born 1930), American historian
Harold Gray (1894–1968), American cartoonist
Harold St George Gray, British archeologist
Harry Gray (business) (1919–2009), American business executive
Harry B. Gray (born 1935), American chemist
Hawthorne C. Gray (1889–1927), American balloonist
Henry Gray (disambiguation), multiple people
Herb Gray (1931–2014), Canadian politician
Herb Gray (Canadian football) (1934–2011), American-born Canadian football player
Herbert Branston Gray (1851–1929), English clergyman and schoolmaster 
Horace Gray (1828–1902), American jurist

I
Iain Gray
The Honourable Sir Ian Campbell-Gray
Isaac P. Gray

J
James Gray (disambiguation), multiple people
Jamie Gray (disambiguation), multiple people
Jamie Gray, a British murderer
Jamie Gray Hyder, American actress and model
Jamie Lynn Gray (born 1984), American Olympic sport shooter 
Jason Gray (musician) (born 1972), American contemporary Christian singer-songwriter
Jason Gray (poet), American poet 
Jason Gray-Stanford, Canadian actor
Jeffrey Alan Gray, British psychologist
Jerry Gray, American football player
Jerry Gray (arranger), (1915–1976), arranger, composer, and conductor
Jesse Gray (1923–1988), New York civil right leader and politician
Jim Gray (sportscaster), American sportscaster
Jim Gray (UDA member), leader of the Ulster Defence Association in Northern Ireland
John Gray (disambiguation), multiple people
Johnny Gray, American 800m runner
Jon Gray (born 1991), American baseball player
Joseph Gray (disambiguation), multiple people
Joseph Anthony Gray, US Congressman from Pennsylvania
Joseph M. M. Gray, Chancellor of American University from 1933 until 1941
 Josh Gray (basketball) (born 1993), American basketball player
 Josh Gray (footballer) (born 1991), English footballer
Josiah Gray (born 1997), American baseball player
J. T. Gray (born 1996), American football player
Julian Gray, English footballer

K
Karla M. Gray, American judge
Katherine Gray, American artist
Kelly Gray, American soccer player
Kelly Gray (musician), American producer and guitarist
Kevin Gray (disambiguation), multiple people

L
Larry Gray, jazz musician
Lawrence Gray, American actor
Lee Gray, American DJ
Les Gray, English singer
Liam Gray, Scottish footballer
Liam Gray, (born 2006), Australian prime minister 
Linda Gray, American actress
Linda Esther Gray (born 1948), Scottish opera singer
Lord Gray, title in the Peerage of Scotland
Loren Gray (born 2002), American singer and social media personality
Lorna Gray (1917–2017), American actress
Louis Harold Gray, British physicist
Lyons Gray, American politician

M
Mackenzie Gray, Canadian actor
Macy Gray, American R&B, soul and neo-soul singer, songwriter, record producer and actress
Marlin Gray, American murderer
Martin Gray (disambiguation), multiple people
Mary Tenney Gray (1833-1904), American writer, clubwoman, philanthropist, suffragette
Matt Gray (1936–2016), Scottish footballer (Third Lanark, Manchester City)
Mel Gray (disambiguation), multiple people
Michael Gray (DJ), British DJ and house music producer
Michael Gray (footballer), English football full-back
Michael John Gray (born c. 1976), member of the Arkansas House of Representatives
Mike Gray (1935–2013), American writer, screenwriter, cinematographer, film producer and director
Morris Gray, Canadian politician

N
Nan Grey, American actress
Naomi Gray, American, first female Vice President of Planned Parenthood
Neely Gray, American businessman and territorial legislator
Neil Gray, Scottish National Party politician
Nigel Gray, English record producer
Noah Gray (born 1999), American football player
Noel Desmond Gray (1920–1999), Australian businessman

O
Owen Gray (born 1939), Jamaican musician

P
Pat Gray, American radio personality
Patrick Gray, 4th Lord Gray, (died 1584) Scottish nobleman
Patrick Gray, 6th Lord Gray, (died 1612) Scottish nobleman, grandson of the above
L. Patrick Gray, Acting director of the FBI from 1972 to 1973
Paul Gray (disambiguation), multiple people
Pearl Zane Gray, American western novelist under the pen name Zane Grey
Percy Gray, American artist
Peter Gray (disambiguation), multiple people
Pete Gray (1915–2002), one-armed Major League baseball player
Pete Gray (activist) (1980–2011), Australian environmental and anti-war activist
Polly Gray, character in Peaky Blinders

Q
Quinn Gray, American football quarterback

R
Raphael Gray (born 1981), British computer hacker
Richard Gray (game designer) (born 1957), video game designer
Richard E. Gray (1945 – 1982), NASA test pilot
Robbie Gray (born 1988), Australian Rules Football player
Robert Gray (disambiguation), multiple people
Robin Gray (disambiguation), multiple people
Rocky Gray (born 1974), American musician and songwriter
Roger Gray (1881 – 1959), American character actor
 Roger Gray (1921–1996), professor and expert on agricultural futures markets
Ron Gray (disambiguation), multiple people
Ross F. Gray (1920 – 1945), American soldier, Medal of Honor awardee

S
Sally Gray, English actress
Samuel Gray (Australian politician), Australian politician
Samuel Frederick Gray (1766–1828), British Botanist (IPNI = Gray)
Selina Gray (1823-1907), enslaved woman who rescued historical heirlooms
Simon Gray, English playwright
Sonny Gray (born 1989), American baseball player
Spalding Gray, American actor, screenwriter and playwright
Stephen Gray (scientist) (1666–1736), English astronomer and scientist
Stephen Gray (writer) (1941–2020), South African author
Steven Gray (footballer) (born 1981), Irish defender for Derry City F.C.
Stuart Gray (basketball) (born 1963), American basketball player
Sylvia Gray (1909–1991), English businessperson

T
T. M. Gray, American horror novelist and illustrator
Tamyra Gray, American actress and singer
Thomas Gray, British poet and scholar
Thomas Gray (VC), British soldier
Thomas Cecil Gray, British anaesthetist
Thomas Lomar Gray, British engineer
Tom Gray, bluegrass musician
Tony Gray (disambiguation), multiple people

V
Valerie Gray, fictional character from the television series Danny Phantom
Veleka Gray, American actress
Vincent C. Gray, American politician
Vincent R. Gray, New Zealand chemist
Violet Gray, fictional character from the Peanuts comic strip
Virgil Gray (born 1984), American football player
Vivean Gray (1924–2016), British actress based in Australia

W
Walter de Gray, English prelate and politician
Walter de Gray Birch, English historian
Wardell Gray, American jazz bebop saxophonist
Wayne D. Gray, cognitive science professor
Wells Gray (1876–1944), Canadian politician, creator of Wells Gray Provincial Park
William Gray (disambiguation), multiple people
Willoughby Gray, English actor
Woodville Gray, Scottish footballer of the 1880s
Wyndol Gray, (1922–1994), American basketball player

See also
Grey (surname)

Footnotes
Hanks, Patrick; Hodges, Flavia; Mills, A. D.; Room, Adrian (2002). The Oxford Names Companion. Oxford: the University Press; p. 260

English-language surnames
Surnames from nicknames